Love Letter Kill Shot is the twelfth studio album by Christian rock group Disciple.  It is the seventh album by the band to be produced by Travis Wyrick, and was mixed and mastered by Zeuss (Demon Hunter, War of Ages, Iced Earth, Queensryche). The album was released on September 13th, 2019. "Love Letter Kill Shot is nothing like our past albums," vocalist Kevin Young told New Release Today in an interview about the album, "It's nothing like Attack or Long Live the Rebels or Vultures or O God Save Us All or Horseshoes & Handgrenades. It's so different. The music is different. The lyrics are different. The way that we're saying things are different. But, the vision is the same. I guess we were able to tap into creativity and freshness that we've never been able to tap into before. It's very, very exciting for us."

Critical reception

The album received strong to positive ratings. Jesus Freak Hideout gave a 4 out of 5, saying, "Disciple has always had musical cohesion within a single album. Love Letter Kill Shot has that musical cohesion, and might be their most thematically cohesive album to date." Cross Rhythms gave an 8 out of 10, saying, "When a band has been around for as long as they have, it can be very easy to get stuck in a rut churning out carbon copy albums or resting on the success of the past but that is not the case with Disciple. They have evolved their sound to keep it sounding as fresh as ever." Today's Christian Entertainment said in their 4-star review, "Love Letter Kill Shot delivers beloved metal and hard rock melodies that Disciple is known for, along with open, honest, thought-provoking lyrics that challenge listeners to take a look at their life and their faith. With the popularity of the few singles released already, I believe Disciple fans will not be disappointed with the album in its entirety."

Track listing

Personnel
Disciple
 Kevin Young - lead vocals
 Josiah Prince - rhythm guitar, bass, backing vocals, production
 Andrew Stanton - lead guitar
 Joey West - drums, backing vocals

Additional Personnel
 Zeuss - mixing and mastering
 Travis Wyrick - production
 Dane Allen - backing vocals on "Fire Away"
 Andrew Schwab (Project 86) - guest vocals on "Panic Room"

References

Tooth & Nail Records albums
2019 albums